Elsa Papadimitriou (16 February 1942 – 17 March 2022) was a Greek politician. A member of the New Democracy party, she served in the Hellenic Parliament from 1993 to 2011. She died in Athens on 17 March 2022 at the age of 80.

References

1942 births
2022 deaths
University of California, Berkeley alumni
New Democracy (Greece) politicians
Greek MPs 1993–1996
Greek MPs 1996–2000
Greek MPs 2000–2004
Greek MPs 2004–2007
Greek MPs 2007–2009
Greek MPs 2009–2012
People from Nafplion
21st-century Greek women politicians
National Technical University of Athens alumni
20th-century Greek women politicians